Go Go 70s is a 2008 South Korean musical drama film set in the 1970s.

Plot
South Korea in the 1970s was in the Dark Ages of Park Chung-hee's military dictatorship, but it was also an era of revolutionary upheaval with regards to culture. After wandering the shabby clubs of a U.S. military base, vocalist Sang-kyu and guitarist Man-sik form the indie rock band The Devils with four other members. After entering a rock band contest and making a strong impression with their shocking yet entertaining performance, The Devils achieve stardom and begin playing at a club called Nirvana. Mimi, a groupie who follows the Devils from town to town, also becomes an icon with her dance moves and fashion sense. However, their heyday doesn't last long as one of the band members gets killed in a fire at the club. To make matters worse, many clubs are being forced to shut down due to military oppression, which would fundamentally take away the opportunity for bands to perform. Despite their despair and looming disbandment, Sang-kyu plans one last concert for The Devils.

Cast
 Cho Seung-woo as Sang-kyu, The Devils vocalist and guitarist
 Shin Min-a as Mimi, leader of Wild Girls
 Cha Seung-woo as Man-sik, The Devils guitarist
 Song Kyung-ho as Dong-geun, The Devils drummer
 Choi Min-chul as Dong-soo, The Devils trumpet player
 Kim Min-kyu as Kyung-goo, The Devils bassist
 Hong Kwang-ho as Joon-yeob, The Devils saxophonist
 Lee Sung-min as Lee Byeong-wook
 Im Yeong-sik as Byeong-tae
 Kim Soo-jeong as Young-ja
 Yoon Chae-yeon as Ki-bok
 Min Bok-gi as boss of club Nirvana
 Yoo Chang-sook as Dong-soo's mother
 Lee Sang-yong as Nam-dae criminal investigator 
 Hong Seok-bin as Criminal investigator of The Devils 1 
 Jo Deok-jae as Criminal investigator of The Devils 2 
 Kwon Jeong-min as Jailhouse police 
 Jin Yong-gook as Folk song singer Teacher Kim 
 Kim Jae-rok as Recording engineer 
 Kwon Hyeok-poong as Music salon owner
 Hwang Yeon-hee as President of American club
 Yoon Jeong-yeon as Mimi's backup dancer
 Jang Mi-yeon as Mimi's backup dancer
 Oh Ji-eun as Fighting prostitute
 Lee Jong-yoon as Gambling band 
 Geum Gi-jong as Gambling band 
 Park Soo-jo as Jailhouse detective 
 Kim Jong-eon as Bat group 
 Lee Ha-neul as Bat group 
 Kim Hyeong-jin as Bat group 
 Lee Si-eun as Criminal investigator of Lee Byeong-wook 
 Im Hyeong-tae as Young-ja's father 
 Kim Moon-yeong as Lee Byeong-wook's fan 
 Lee Malg-eum as Lee Byeong-wook's fan 
 Hong Sang-jin as Scottman 
 Choi Pyeong-woong as Daehan news announcer

Production
The screenplay was co-written by director Choi Ho, composer Bang Jun-seok and Baek Bae-jeong, based on Bang's experiences as a child listening to The Beatles. Lead actor Cho Seung-woo took guitar lessons to prepare for his role.

Box office
The film sold 595,156 tickets nationwide and earned $3,433,279.

Awards and nominations

References

External links
  
 
 
 

South Korean musical drama films
Films set in the 1970s
2000s Korean-language films
2000s musical drama films
Showbox films
Films directed by Choi Ho
2008 drama films
2008 films
2000s South Korean films